Jeffrey Leon Webb (born on January 31, 1982) is a former gridiron football wide receiver. He was drafted by the Kansas City Chiefs in the sixth round of the 2006 NFL Draft. He played college football at San Diego State.

Webb also played for the Toronto Argonauts.

Professional career

Kansas City Chiefs
Webb played the first three seasons of his career with the Kansas City Chiefs and played in 31 games, catching 36 passes for 382 yards and a touchdown.

Toronto Argonauts
On April 22, 2010, Webb signed with the Toronto Argonauts of the Canadian Football League. He was released by the Argonauts on August 31.

Omaha Nighthawks
Webb signed with the Omaha Nighthawks of the United Football League on August 25, 2011.

References

External links
Just Sports Stats
Toronto Argonauts bio
San Diego State Aztecs bio

1982 births
Living people
Sportspeople from Pontiac, Michigan
Players of American football from Michigan
American football return specialists
American football wide receivers
Canadian football wide receivers
San Diego State Aztecs football players
Kansas City Chiefs players
Toronto Argonauts players
Omaha Nighthawks players